Rybin (Russian: Рыбин; Ukrainian: Рибін) is a surname. Notable people with the surname include:
 Aleksei Rybin, a lead guitarist for the Russian rock band Kino
 Georgy Rybin (1901–1974), Russian hуdrographer and explorer
 Maxim Rybin (born 1981), Russian professional ice hockey winger
 Ondřej Rybín (born 1993), Czech male track cyclist
 Ruslan Rybin (born 1992), Russian professional football player
 Vladislav Rybin (born 1978), Russian professional football player
 Volodymyr Rybin (born 1980), Ukrainian professional racing cyclist
 Yuriy Rybin (born 1963), Russian javelin thrower